Picton is an unincorporated community located in Prince Edward County in southeastern Ontario, roughly  east of Toronto. It is the county's largest community and former seat located at the southwestern end of Picton Bay, a branch of the Bay of Quinte, which is along the northern shoreline of Lake Ontario. The town is named for Lieutenant General Sir Thomas Picton, who served in the British Army during the Peninsular War in Spain and Portugal. He also saw action at the Battle of Waterloo, where he was killed. It was formerly incorporated as a town. Picton is home to the Picton Pirates of the Empire B Junior C Hockey League in the Ontario Hockey Association.

History

General overview

Picton, originally named Hallowell, was first settled in the 1780s by Loyalists from the Thirteen Colonies. Prior to its incorporation in 1837, the modern-day town of Picton consisted of two separate villages, Hallowell Bridge and Picton, which occupied the opposite sides of Picton Bay. Named for General Sir Thomas Picton, an Allied Divisional commander at the Battle of Waterloo, the Town of Picton has a profound and rich history. It was here that Sir John A. Macdonald managed a law office for his uncle, Lowther P. MacPherson. In 1998, the town and all other municipalities in the county were dissolved and amalgamated into a single-tier municipality, the Corporation of the County of Prince Edward. Each of the former municipalities is now a ward of the county. Picton is Ward 1.

Airfield
During the Second World War, the United Kingdom came under siege and required training facilities outside the British Isles for the thousands of pilots needed for its defence. Because of geographical similarities to Great Britain, sparsely populated Prince Edward County was considered an ideal location for a Royal Air Force Bombing and Gunnery School. In the summer of 1940, an aerodrome was rapidly constructed and in November 1940, the RCAF moved in and began small-arms training at the facility. In April 1941, the RAF took over the station and No 31 Bombing and Gunnery School was formed. The school was part of the British Commonwealth Air Training Plan and used to train many of the aircrew needed to help defend Great Britain. 

Following the end of the war, the Canadian Army maintained a training facility at the old aerodrome. It was renamed "Camp Picton" in 1960 when it became a fully operational Army base. In 1966, it was renamed Canadian Forces Base Picton, but this proved short-lived: in 1969, the base was closed down and sold as part of the consolidation and downsizing of the Canadian military. Portions of the base have been divided up and have served many functions, including conversion of one of the newer barracks sections into a hospital (now defunct). Much of the old base housing is currently occupied as rental homes. The airfield is now known as Picton Airport. The original aerodrome facilities were built using different construction methods than most bases built by the Canadian military. The rapid construction meant that the hangars and other buildings were not designed for longevity, although most still remain standing today. The former Camp Picton now serves many diverse functions but the unique appearance of the base makes it a significant, if obscure, historical landmark. Due to its distinctive appearance, the dilapidated airport has been used as a filming location for several productions. External scenes for the made-for-TV film Haven, starring Natasha Richardson, Colm Feore and Martin Landau were filmed there. It also served as a backdrop for the 1993 CBC production Dieppe and was the filming location of Bomber Boys. It also served as the home of the Driver Rehabilitation Centre for the reality television program Canada's Worst Driver in 2005. Many businesses use the facilities, including a hammock outlet, an auction house and, since the late-1970s, the local Air Cadet squadron, 851 RC(Air)CS, Prince Edward. The airstrip is also the host to various motorsports events, such as those held by the St. Lawrence Auto Club, which regularly runs Solo II racing events in the summer months.

Infrastructure

Transportation
Picton Airport is a general aviation airport used primarily for recreational flying. It is also used regularly in the summer season for Canadian Air Cadet flight training using Schweizer SGS 2-33A glider sailplanes and Bellanca Scout 8GCBC aircraft. Highway 33, also known as the Loyalist Parkway, passes through the centre of Picton and serves as its main link to the larger Ontario highway system. Proceeding north-northeast from Picton is County Highway 49 which eventually connects to Highway 401 between Greater Napanee and Shannonville, after passing through a portion of Tyendinaga Mohawk Territory. At one time, Prince Edward County was served by an extensive rail system. However, the railway no longer exists. The former rail beds have been converted into recreational trails which wind around the outskirts of Picton and throughout the County and are used for various purposes year-round. Picton has extensive small-craft docking facilities and boat launch ramps. There are no facilities for heavy shipping at the tip of the bay, so large commercial vessels are generally not seen in the portion of Picton Bay near the town. However, east of town, on the northern shore of the bay, is the ESSROC cement plant which has industrial docking facilities.

Utilities
In the past, electrical services had been managed by the local utilities commission. In recent years, this was eliminated and electrical power is now managed by the central Hydro One, a former Government of Ontario Crown corporation.

Economy

Other industry
Just northeast of Picton is a cement plant owned by HeidelbergCement and operated by Lehigh Cement Company, which is the only heavy industry in the immediate area.

Education
The public school system is served by the Hastings & Prince Edward District School Board. The separate school system is served by the Algonquin and Lakeshore Catholic District School Board.
Elementary schools: St. Gregory Catholic School
Secondary school: Prince Edward Collegiate Institute
Private school: Sonrise Christian Academy
The Pinecrest Memorial Elementary School closed in 2017 and the Queen Elizabeth Public School in 2018.

Media

Newspaper
 The Picton Gazette, Canada's oldest weekly newspaper.

Radio
 FM 99.3-CJPE ("County FM")

See also List of radio stations in Ontario.

Theatre
 Regent Theatre

Notable residents
 Reema Abdo, who won a bronze medal at the 1984 Olympics in swimming.
 Cameron Ansell, voice actor
 Jack Gibson, ice hockey left winger
 Lyle Vanclief, former minister of agriculture and agri-food (1997–2003)
 Jess Jones, ice hockey forward

See also
List of townships in Ontario

References

External links

 Official website of Prince Edward County

Former towns in Ontario
Communities in Prince Edward County, Ontario
Populated places disestablished in 1998